This is a list of football clubs in Afghanistan, which compete in the various divisions of Afghan football league system.

Afghan Premier League 
De Abasin Sape F.C.
De Maiwand Atalan F.C.
De Spin Ghar Bazan F.C.
Mawjhai Amu F.C.
Oqaban Hindukush F.C.

Shaheen Asmayee F.C.
Simorgh Alborz F.C.
Toofan Harirod F.C.

Kabul Premier League 
 Afghan United Kabul F.C.
 Aieynda F.C.
 Hakim Sanayi Kabul F.C.
 Javan Azadi Kabul F.C.
 Javan Minan Kabul F.C.
 Kabul Bank F.C.
 Maiwand Kabul F.C.
 Nijat Kabul F.C.
 Pamir Kabul F.C.
 Ordu Kabul F.C.
 Sarmi Yashy Kabul F.C.
 Shiva Kabul F.C.
 Shooy Kabul F.C.
 Slbaian Kabul F.C.
 Solh Kabul F.C.

Other football clubs 
 Afghan Freemont
 Kabul United F.C.
 Ariana Herat
 Ariana Kabul F.C.
 Arianda
 Ashiana BK
 Atalspor
 Bamika
 Kandahar Aryan
 Karlappan
 Konkord Kabul
 Mahmoudiyeh F.C.
 Nouristan Nouristan
 Real Afghan Kabul
 UD Djavanspor (Djavan Umid)

External links
 List of best football clubs in Afghanistan

 
Football clubs
Football clubs
Afghanistan